Katarína Dostalova (born 11 February 1982 in Prešov, Slovakia) is a Slovak singer who rose to popularity after winning Slovensko Hľadá SuperStar, the Slovak version of Pop Idol, shown by STV.

Slovensko hľadá SuperStar Performances

Discography
Albums
Slovensko hľadá Superstar Top 11 (April 2005)
Ešte sa nepoznáme (July 2005)
Naboso (October 2006)
Nebotrasenie (February 2009)
Štedrý večer (October 2012)
Oknom (September 2014)

Singles
Katka
Pehatá
Koľko ešte krát
Posledná

See also
 The 100 Greatest Slovak Albums of All Time

External links
Official Site (In Slovak)

1982 births
Living people
Idols (TV series) winners
Musicians from Prešov
21st-century Slovak women singers